The 2011 Rugby World Cup qualifying process ended with a play-off to decide the 20th and final qualifier. Four teams, the best non-qualifier from each region except Oceania, competed for the last place at the 2011 Rugby World Cup finals in New Zealand. Romania beat Uruguay in the play-off final, and went on to compete in Pool B in New Zealand, along with Argentina, England, Scotland and Georgia.

The play-off was contested on a knockout basis, with a semi-final and a two-legged home and away final. One semi-final featured Romania, the winner of the European Nations Cup Champions Playoff Series, defeating Tunisia, the loser of the African final.  The other saw Uruguay, the loser of Round Four of the Americas qualification, beat Kazakhstan, the second-place finisher at the 2010 Asian Five Nations.

The host of each semi-final was the team with the higher IRB Ranking at the moment when it became known who the two teams were.

Romania won the final over Uruguay with a victory and a draw to qualify for the 2011 Rugby World Cup.

Participants

* IRB World Rankings on 22 May 2010, the date that both the Asia and Americas qualifiers were known.
** IRB World Rankings on 5 June 2010, the date that both the African and European qualifiers were known.

Preliminary round

Qualification final

First leg

Second leg

Sources
Official site

2011
Play-off
2010–11 in Romanian rugby union
rugby union
rugby union
rugby union

de:Rugby-Union-Weltmeisterschaft 2011/Qualifikation
fr:Qualifications pour la Coupe du monde de rugby à XV de 2011
it:Coppa del Mondo di rugby 2011 (Qualificazioni)